Stoke Ferry is a village and civil parish in the English county of Norfolk, 6.5 miles south-east of Downham Market. The village lies on the River Wissey, previously known as the River Stoke.
For the purposes of local government, it falls within the district of King's Lynn and West Norfolk.

All Saints' Church is no longer used for church services. It is now owned by Kit Hesketh-Harvey.

The village has many small businesses such as two takeaway shops, a hairdresser, Wood Yard and a corner shop. There was also previously a pub, which is currently raising money for reopening, as of April 2021.

Historical references
In 1805, Stoke Ferry is described as being "distant from London 88 miles 2 furlongs; on the Stoke river, which is navigable to this place from the Ouse. Fair, December 6...on the right, 5 m is the seat of Robert Wilson, esq. Inn, Crown."

The village was serving as a post town (under the name 'Stoke') by 1775; the name had been changed to 'Stoke Ferry' by 1816. A type of postmark known as an undated circle was issued to the village in 1828, and it had a Penny Post service, under Brandon (in Suffolk), between 1835 and 1840.

Many photographs of the village can be found in a collection published in 2007 available to purchase at £4.95 from Bonnetts Hardware & DIY in the village.

From the early 2000s it was used as a wood yard which moved to the new yard near Boughton it has since been derelict and had several owners.

There is still a thriving Blacksmith's shop, Thomas B. Bonnett in the heart of the village that has been trading over 100 years.
As well as Bespoke Ironwork, they also sell hardware, plumbing supplies, timber and steel.
As well as a hairdressers, take aways and many other small businesses that help make Stoke Ferry recognisable.

Notes

Further reading
Stoke Ferry: the Story of a Norfolk Village, by Doris E. Coates, Harpsden Press, 1980,

External links
 Stoke Ferry Website

 
Villages in Norfolk
Civil parishes in Norfolk
King's Lynn and West Norfolk